In Irish mythology, Danand or Donann is the daughter of Delbáeth, son of Ogma, (Not to be confused with the similarly named Danu)
Danand is the mother of Brian, Iuchar, and Iucharba by her own father, who is occasionally given the name Tuireann or Tuirell as well.

Footnotes

References

Tuatha Dé Danann